Diagnosis: Murder fifth season originally aired Thursdays at 9:00–10:00 pm (EST).

The season was released on DVD in two parts and as a whole by Visual Entertainment, Inc. When the split season was released, the episode of Obsession Part 2 wasn't included. The scene where Mark meets Rob Petrie at the radio station is absent in the single releases but was included in the complete collection set.

Cast
Dick Van Dyke as Dr. Mark Sloane
Victoria Rowell as Dr. Amanda Bentley
Charlie Schlatter as Dr. Jesse Travis
Barry Van Dyke as Steve Sloane

Episodes

References

Diagnosis: Murder seasons
1997 American television seasons
1998 American television seasons